Yemen competed at the 2020 Summer Olympics in Tokyo. Originally scheduled to take place from 24 July to 9 August 2020, the Games were postponed to 23 July to 8 August 2021, because of the COVID-19 pandemic.

Competitors
The following is the list of number of competitors in the Games.

Athletics

Yemen received universality slots from IAAF to send one athletes to the Olympics.

Track & road events

Judo

Yemen entered one male judoka into the Olympic tournament after International Judo Federation awarded them a tripartite invitation quota.

Shooting

Yemen received an invitation from the Tripartite Commission to send a women's pistol shooter to the Olympics, as long as the minimum qualifying score (MQS) was met, marking the nation's Olympic debut in the sport.

Qualification Legend: Q = Qualify for the next round; q = Qualify for the bronze medal (shotgun)

Swimming

Yemen received a universality invitation from FINA to send two top-ranked swimmers (one per gender) in their respective individual events to the Olympics, based on the FINA Points System of June 28, 2021.

References

Nations at the 2020 Summer Olympics
2020
2021 in Yemeni sport